Sotira may refer to several places in Greece and Cyprus:

 Sotira, Pella, Greece
 Sotira, Trikala, Greece
 Sotira, Famagusta, Cyprus
 Sotira, Limassol, Cyprus
 Sotira, an Ottoman settlement at the location of modern Karditsa, Greece